Patrick Hoffman (born 25 July 1974 in Munich) is a German curler. He is a former World men's silver medallist and a two time European men's champion. He competed at the 2002 Salt Lake City Olympics on the German team that placed sixth with a 4-5 record. He played for Team Europe at 2004 Continental Cup of Curling.

Teams

References

External links
 
 Interview mit Patrick Hoffmann - Curling-Europameister 

1974 births
Living people
Sportspeople from Munich
German male curlers
Olympic curlers of Germany
Curlers at the 2002 Winter Olympics
European curling champions
Continental Cup of Curling participants